Pseudorhaphitoma alma is a small sea snail, a marine gastropod mollusk in the family Mangeliidae.

Description
The length of the shell varies between 5–6 mm.

Distribution
This marine genus occurs off Zanzibar and East Africa.

References

 Thiele, J. 1925. Gastropoda der Deutschen Tiefsee-Expedition, 11. Wiss. Ergebn. dt. Tiefsee Exped. 'Valdivia' 17(2): 37-382

External links
 R.N. Kilburn, Turridae (Mollusca: Gastropoda) of southern Africa and Mozambique. Part 7. Subfamily Mangeliinae, section 2; Annals of the Natal Museum 34, pp 317 - 367 (1993)
 
 

alma
Gastropods described in 1925